HMS Smiter may refer to:

 , launched in 1943, was a Ruler-class escort carrier, originally built as USS Vermillion (CVE-52); served in World War II and was returned to the U.S. Navy in 1946
 , a tank landing ship launched in 1944; renamed Smiter from LST 3514 in 1947; sold in 1949 and wrecked soon after
 , a P2000-class patrol vessel commissioned in February 1986; currently active

References
 

Royal Navy ship names